The 11:30 Report is a Philippine television news broadcasting show broadcast by GMA Network. It premiered on November 1, 1982. The show concluded on May 16, 1986. It was replaced by GMA Headline News in its timeslot.

Anchors
 Tina Monzon-Palma 
 Raffy Marcelo 
 Tony Zorilla 
 Jose Mari Velez

Segments
News in Review

References

1982 Philippine television series debuts
1986 Philippine television series endings
English-language television shows
GMA Network news shows
Philippine television news shows